Pedro Arias de Ávila (1440 – March 6, 1531) (often Pedrarias Dávila) was a Spanish soldier and colonial administrator. He led the first great Spanish expedition to the mainland of the New World. There he served as governor of Panama (1514–1526) and Nicaragua (1527–1531), and founded Panama City (1519).

He died in 1531 aged around 91.

Family
Pedrarias was the son of Pedro Arias and María Ortiz de Cota. He was born into a prominent and well-connected Spanish family. His grandfather, Diego Arias de Ávila, was chief comptroller and a key adviser to King Enrique IV; his older brother was the Count of Puñonrostro; and his uncle was the Bishop of Segovia, a wealthy man who left Pedrarias a fortune.

Early life
As a boy, Pedrarias was a page in the court of King Juan II of Castile. Physically imposing and athletic, he was nicknamed "the jouster" for his skill in tournaments and "the gallant" in reference to his extravagant wardrobe and spendthrift habits. In later life, he served in the war against the Moors in Granada (1482–1492) and distinguished himself as a colonel of infantry fighting in North Africa (1508–1511). When he returned to Spain, he received a promotion, a citation for valor, and another nickname: "the lion of Bugia".

Towards the end of 1485, he married an intimate friend of queen Isabella I of Spain, Isabel de Bobadilla y Peñalosa, the daughter of Francisco de Bobadilla who was appointed to succeed Christopher Columbus as the second governor of the Indies in 1499.
Like many men of their time, Arias de Avila was hard and cruel. One particular event may have solidified Pedrarias hardy character. A few years before 1513, he collapsed of some unrecorded illness. As he was about to be lowered to his grave, a tearful servant who was embracing the casket was astonished to hear movement inside. Incredibly, Arias was breathing and very much alive. Thereafter, he ordered an annual Requiem Mass sung for him in the cathedral at Torrejón, and stood in his own unused grave to listen to it. He took his coffin everywhere he went...even to the New World. In 1514, at the age of nearly seventy, he was made commander by King Ferdinand II of Aragon of the largest Spanish expedition (19 vessels and 1,500 men) hitherto sent to America.

America

They reached Santa Marta in Colombia in July 1514. They then proceeded to Darién, where Vasco Núñez de Balboa ruled as governor.

Pedrarias superseded him and promised him his daughter in wedlock but he had Balboa judicially murdered at age 44 on 15 January 1519, being thus a potential bridegroom but never a son-in-law. Pedrarias' daughter was known as "María de Peñalosa" to honor her female ancestors, something by no means uncommon between the High Spanish Nobility at the time. In 1524, she married Rodrigo de Contreras, (Segovia, 1502 - 1558). They had 11 children. Maria died at Ciudad de los Reyes on 25 May 1573.

Another of Pedrarias's daughters, who was born when he was elderly, Isabel Arias or Isabel de Bobadilla to mark the female ancestors of the family, was married in Valladolid, Spain, 1537, to his loyal lieutenant Hernando de Soto, the successful conquistador and explorer of Florida and Mississippi and Governor of Cuba.

In 1519, Dávila founded Panama City and moved his capital there in 1524, abandoning Darién. Dávila sent Gil González Dávila to explore to the north. In 1524, he sent another expedition under Francisco Hernández de Córdoba, who was executed there in 1526 by order of Dávila, by then aged over 85.

Maria Ortiz Cota, the mother of Dávila, was the daughter of Toledo family member and Royal Treasurer Alonso Cota (died 1468) who was married to one Teresa Ortiz, their children being known however as "Ortiz Cota" under the Portuguese family style, whereas, following the Spanish succession style, they would have been known as "Cota Ortiz". 

Moreover, he was a party to the original agreement with Francisco Pizarro and Diego de Almagro which brought about the discovery of Peru, but he withdrew (1526) for a small compensation, having lost confidence in the outcome. In the same year, he was superseded as Governor of Panama by Pedro de los Ríos and retired to León, Nicaragua, where he was named its new governor on July 1, 1527. Here he lived for the rest of his life until he died at the age of 91 on March 6, 1531.

He left an unenviable record, as a man of unreliable character, and who was cruel and unscrupulous. Through his foundation of Panama, however, he laid the basis for the discovery of South America's west coast and the subsequent conquest of Peru.

Notes

References

Spanish references 

Alvarez Rubiano, Pablo: Pedrarias Dávila. Contribución a la  figura del "Gran Justador", Gobernador de Castilla del Oro y  Nicaragua.  Madrid, 1944.
Cantera Burgos, Francisco: Pedrarias Dávila y Cota, capitán general y gobernador de Castilla del Oro y Nicaragua: sus antecedentes judíos. Universidad de Madrid, Cátedra de Lengua Hebrea e Historia de los judíos. Madrid, 1971.
Gitlitz, David M., Los Arias Dávila de Segovia: entre la iglesia y la sinagoga- (Baltimore: International Scholars Publications, 1996.
Mena García, Carmen: Pedrarias Dávila o la Ira de Dios: una historia olvidada. Publicaciones de la Universidad de Sevilla, Sevilla, 1992 (281 págs.) 
Mena García, Carmen: Sevilla y las flotas de Indias. La gran armada de Castilla del Oro, 1513-1514. Universidad de Sevilla, Fundación cultural El Monte, Sevilla, 1998 (458 págs.), 2ª edición Sevilla, 1999. 
Mena García, Carmen: Un linaje de conversos en tierras americanas. Los testamentos de Pedrarias Dávila, gobernador de Castilla del Oro y Nicaragua. León, 2004; 202 págs.

External links
Catholic Encyclopedia
Hernando de Soto's activity with Pedrarias Dávila in Panama

1440s births
1531 deaths
People from Segovia
Royal Governors of Panama
Spanish city founders
Spanish explorers
Spanish conquistadors
Panama City
15th-century Castilians
16th-century Spanish people